Nanoro is a town in the Nanoro Department of Boulkiemdé Province in central western Burkina Faso. It is the capital of Nanoro Department and has a population of 5,234.

References

External links
Satellite map at Maplandia.com

Populated places in Boulkiemdé Province